Neil Stirton (born 1981) is a British sport shooter.

Career
Stirton has held a number of Scottish and British shooting records. In the 2005 Commonwealth Shooting Federation Championships (the test event for the 2006 Melbourne Commonwealth Games), Stirton won Silver in the 50M Rifle Prone Pairs partnering with Martin Sinclair. The pair went on to win Silver in the same event at the 2006 Commonwealth Games. Partnering with Jonathan Hammond at the 2010 Commonwealth Games, Stirton won Gold in the Prone Pairs, and Bronze in the 50M Rifle 3 Positions Pairs.

In 2008, Stirton won the silver medal in the 50M Prone Rifle at the Munich World Cup, where he shot a career personal best and British record of 599 in the Qualification stage. His Silver medal position qualified him for the 2008 World Cup Final where he finished twelfth.

References

1981 births
Living people
Scottish male sport shooters
British male sport shooters
Commonwealth Games gold medallists for Scotland
Commonwealth Games silver medallists for Scotland
Commonwealth Games bronze medallists for Scotland
ISSF rifle shooters
Shooters at the 2006 Commonwealth Games
Shooters at the 2010 Commonwealth Games
Shooters at the 2014 Commonwealth Games
Sportspeople from Aberdeen
Commonwealth Games medallists in shooting
Medallists at the 2006 Commonwealth Games
Medallists at the 2010 Commonwealth Games